The New Federal State of China (NFSC) is a political movement or lobby group created by Guo Wengui and Steve Bannon, with the stated aim of overthrowing the Chinese Communist Party (CCP) as the Chinese government. Launched on June 4, 2020, in New York City, the body has been referred to by its founders as a "government in exile" of China. 

A related group,  the Himalaya Supervisory Organization, an NGO, is dedicated to spreading the word and acting as the means of communications with "international communities". The group operates in Australia under the name Himalaya Australia, in New Zealand under Himalaya New Zealand and in the UK as Himalaya UK. It has been involved in protests against the Chinese government, has opposed the arrest of Bannon in the US, and presented at the time contrarian takes on the origins and treatment of the COVID-19 virus in Australia.

Establishment and organization
The group evolved from a group of self-proclaimed whistleblowers known as Bàoliào Gémìng (Whistleblower Movement), rebranded by Bannon and Guo as the New Federal State of China. The group's presence has been boosted by a US-based Chinese influencer on YouTube named Lude, who is, according to an ex-insider, "the number one propagandist for Guo Wengui".

The announcement of the establishment of the group was heralded by aircraft flying banners over US cities, including New York, and celebrated a ceremony attended by Guo and Bannon on board Guo's yacht in New York Harbor. At that gathering, Bannon restated his intention to help to overthrow the CCP.

Former Chinese football star Hao Haidong was involved in reading the “Declaration of New Federal State of China", as was his wife, the retired badminton star Ye Zhaoying. Another sponsor was American hedge fund manager Kyle Bass. Announcement of the state was designed to coincide with the 31st anniversary of the Tiananmen Square massacre on 4 June 1989, with the purpose of the state described as being to "overthrow the Chinese government". It has been described as a political group.

The "Declaration of The New Federal State of China", posted on Guo's G News website on June 3:

Guo claims to have invested $100 million in the movement. Funding for the movement, as well as its sources, are under investigation by the FBI.

Bannon has described his role as an "adviser" to the group.

On July 15, 2021, The Daily Beast reported that Bannon and Guo were operating a fake embassy on East 64th Street, in New York City, known as the consulate for the "New Federal State of China," or "The Himalaya Embassy," that is an operating center for various right-wing media and nonprofits manufacturing bogus conspiracy theories. The fortified building was built in 2015 for Argentine billionaire Eduardo Eurnekian.

Responses and analysis
PRC foreign ministry spokesman Geng Shuang stated in response to questions for comment on the declaration "To these absurd statements, to this farce, I don’t have any interest in commenting".

The director of the Asia Pacific section at the fact check organisation First Draft News, Anne Kruger, said that the group's followers post "questionable material" prolifically on the internet, and that "Their main tactic is really to try to appeal to people that might have a gripe against the Chinese Communist Party and to push conspiracy theories".

The East Turkistan Government in Exile led East Turkestan/Uyghur, Tibetan, and Manchurian organizations in condemning the 'New Federal State of China', criticizing the founders for unilaterally including East Turkestan (Xinjiang), Manchuria, and Tibet in their proposed new Chinese state and accused them of promoting Chinese imperialism. The ETGE stated that the people of East Turkistan "do not wish to be a part of China nor a “federation” that keeps East Turkistan, Manchuria, South Mongolia, and Tibet under China's rule and influence."

The Tibetan Government-in-Exile expressed disapproval of the group, criticizing the founders for unilaterally including Tibet in their proposed new Chinese state without consultation with Tibetan exiles, and for using disrespectful terms when referring to the Dalai Lama and other Tibetans in exile.

Presence in other countries and online
The Himalaya Supervisory Organization was created to “serve as a bridge of communications between the New Federal State of China and international communities in areas of cooperation, defending people’s freedom, and protecting the security of assets on the basis of common development and mutual respect among the people of the whole world”. The group has established branches in several countries apart from the US, including Canada, Taiwan, Japan, New Zealand and Australia.

In Australia, a Facebook page post dated June 10, 2020 says "It is important for us to know and spread truth of global news to free the Chinese people and free the people around the globe. It is crucial to know the reason that we all stay at home, no schooling at schools and no jobs at our offices or places due to the Chinese Communist Party’s virus. The CCP is a gangster organization that need to be removed from this planet".

Himalaya New Zealand's website states its objectives as "to raise awareness of truth disclosed by the Whistle-blower movement initiated by Mr Miles Guo and the former White House strategist Mr. Steve K. Bannon" and "to counter false narratives forced through left-leaning mainstream media and compromised key NGOs within New Zealand".

A YouTube channel, Himalaya UK, is part of the "Guo Library". The first video published under their name appears to be on August 7, 2020.  it has 1,200 subscribers, but views per video rarely hit 100.

It is said that 26 "farms" have been established by New Federal State of China across 12 different countries in the world. They claim these organizations provide "consultation, mutual aid, financial, and investment service", and to provide shelter and support when the CCP is toppled. They are organized through internet messaging apps including Discord and WhatsApp. The collection of all the "farms" is called the "Himalaya Alliance". Critics claim these farms have dedicated social media channels that require donations to access and gather people to join both online promotion as well as physical activities and protests.

Activities
In late July 2020, during the forced closing of the Chinese Consulate in Houston by the United States government, protesters critical of the People's Republic of China gathered outside the consulate with flags of the New Federal State of China.

In August 2020, supporters of the organisation protested the arrest of Bannon.

During the COVID-19 pandemic, the group has been promoting hydroxychloroquine as an effective treatment for the disease. It has spread the leaflets across Australia by letter-box drop. The group has also been accused of spreading disinformation in Canada about COVID-19, and holding protests accusing people associated with Chinese dissident groups of being “spies”. The group has also participated in anti-vaccine conspiracy campaigns and promotion of more recent unproven therapies such as ivermectin.

The group has been heavily involved in the spread of disputed information about deals US president-elect Joe Biden's son, Hunter Biden, had been involved in, in both China and Ukraine. They have also claimed to have video evidence of sexual abuse in which he was involved, and posted videos online which have been viewed tens of millions of times, but neither the source nor the representations in the videos could be verified as genuine. YouTube influencer Lude was the first to mention the videos in late September 2020, posted to his channel with 200,000 subscribers, and the stories have subsequently been reported extensively on Guo's media outlets, GTV Media Group and G News.

Internal conflict
John Pan, a Chinese migrant to Australia active in human rights advocacy, was drawn into the inner circle of 18 members, which included Chinese dissidents and social media influencers, and worked with Guo for a few months in 2019. After becoming disillusioned and leaving the group in late 2019, Guo branded him a "CCP spy", and in October 2020 a group of people carrying banners bearing NFSC and Himalaya Australia logos and the words "Kick the CCP's agent out of Australia!" stood outside his house chanting those words. Pan and Texan pastor Bob Fu are suing Guo for defamation.

See also
Federal Republic of China
United States of China
GTV Media Group

References

Further reading

China–United States relations
Governments in exile
Steve Bannon
Anti-communist organizations
Federalism in China
Proposed countries